Karl J. Lawrence (May 8, 1901 – January 11, 1992) was an American football and basketball player and coach. He served as the head football coach at Midland College–now known as Midland University–in Fremont, Nebraska from  1930 to 1934 and Allegheny College in Meadville, Pennsylvania from 1935 to 1940, compiling a record of 23–49–7. Lawrence was also the head basketball coach at Allegheny from 1935 to 1941 and at Colgate University from 1941 to 1949, tallying a career college basketball record of 118–96. Lawrence played football, basketball, and baseball at Concordia College in Moorhead, Minnesota, from which he graduated in 1926. He was inducted into the Concordia Athletics Hall of Fame in 1987.

Coaching career
Lawrence was the head football coach at Allegheny College in Meadville, Pennsylvania.  He held that position for six seasons, from 1935 until 1940.  His coaching record at Allegheny was 11–27–4.

Head coaching record

Football

References

1901 births
1992 deaths
American men's basketball players
Allegheny Gators football coaches
Allegheny Gators men's basketball coaches
Colgate Raiders football coaches
Colgate Raiders men's basketball coaches
Concordia Cobbers baseball players
Concordia Cobbers football players
Concordia Cobbers men's basketball players
Midland Warriors football coaches
Players of American football from North Dakota
Basketball players from North Dakota
Baseball players from North Dakota
Basketball coaches from North Dakota